Jannik Christensen (born June 9, 1992) is a Danish professional ice hockey player who is currently with Esbjerg Energy of the Metal Ligaen (DEN). He played with Frölunda HC in the Swedish Elitserien during the 2010–11 Elitserien season before returning to his Danish team Esbjerg Energy.

After establishing himself in three further years in Esbjerg, Christensen opted to attempt a North American career, signing a one-year contract with the Quad City Mallards of the then Central Hockey League on July 31, 2014. With the CHL ceasing operations prior to the season, Christensen remained with the club as it transferred to the ECHL. He returned within the Esbjerg organization the following season.

Career statistics

Regular season and playoffs

International

References

External links

1992 births
Esbjerg Energy players
Frölunda HC players
Living people
Danish ice hockey defencemen
Quad City Mallards (ECHL) players
People from Esbjerg
Sportspeople from the Region of Southern Denmark